Yerkes may refer to:

Yerkes (surname), notable people with this surname
Yerkes, Kentucky
Yerkes, Pennsylvania
 Yerkes Observatory, an astronomical observatory of the University of Chicago
 Yerkes luminosity classification of stars
 Yerkes scheme of galaxy morphological classification
 Yerkes National Primate Research Center, one of eight national primate research centers funded by the National Institutes of Health, located in Atlanta, Georgia at Emory University
 Yerkes–Dodson law, an empirical relationship between arousal and performance first noted by Robert M. Yerkes and John Dillingham Dodson
 990 Yerkes, main belt asteroid
 Yerkes (crater), on the moon